Mohamed Tijani (born 10 July 1997) is a Beninese professional footballer who plays as a defender for Czech First League club Zbrojovka Brno on loan from Viktoria Plzeň and the Benin national team.

Club career

Slavia Prague 
On 10 February 2020, Tijani joined Slavia Prague on loan from Vysočina Jihlava for the remainder of the season, with an option to make the move permanent. On 5 August 2020, Slavia announced the permanent signing of Tijani, and the plan to immediately loan him out to Slovan Liberec.

International career
Tijani was born in the Ivory Coast to a Beninese father and Ivorian mother. He was called up to the Benin national team for a set of friendlies in March 2022.

Career statistics

Club

References

External links 
 

1997 births
Living people
Citizens of Benin through descent
Beninese footballers
Association football defenders
Rayo Vallecano players
Rayo Vallecano B players
FC Vysočina Jihlava players
SK Slavia Prague players
MFK Vyškov players
FC Slovan Liberec players
FK Teplice players
FC Viktoria Plzeň players
Czech National Football League players
Czech First League players
Benin international footballers
Beninese expatriate footballers
Beninese expatriate sportspeople in Spain
Expatriate footballers in Spain
Beninese expatriate sportspeople in the Czech Republic
Expatriate footballers in the Czech Republic
Beninese people of Ivorian descent
Sportspeople of Ivorian descent
Ivorian footballers
Africa Sports d'Abidjan players
Ivorian expatriate sportspeople in Spain
Ivorian expatriate sportspeople in the Czech Republic
Ivorian people of Beninese descent
Sportspeople of Beninese descent
FC Zbrojovka Brno players